In Greek mythology, Diomeneia (Ancient Greek: Διομένειαν) was an Arcadian princess as the daughter of King Arcas.According to Pausanias bronze portrait-statue of a woman said to be Diomeneia existed in a Mantineian market place.

Notes

References 

 Pausanias, Description of Greece with an English Translation by W.H.S. Jones, Litt.D., and H.A. Ormerod, M.A., in 4 Volumes. Cambridge, MA, Harvard University Press; London, William Heinemann Ltd. 1918. . Online version at the Perseus Digital Library
 Pausanias, Graeciae Descriptio. 3 vols. Leipzig, Teubner. 1903. Greek text available at the Perseus Digital Library.

Princesses in Greek mythology
Arcadian mythology